Allen Rivkin (20 November 1903 – 17 February 1990) was an American screenwriter. 

Rivkin was a advertising copy writer, who  went to Hollywood and joined the RKO Pictures publicity department. He formed a film writing team with P. J. Wolfson, who got a writer’s contract on the strength of "Bodies Are Dust". They started at Universal Pictures the same day. Through a luncheon conversation that day decided to collaborate on a story. In less than two years the pair wrote ten screen plays. They later wrote for the B. P. Schulberg company at Paramount Pictures.

He was one of the co-founders of the Screenwriters Guild, later the Writers Guild of America. He wrote several of his scripts with his wife, Laura Kerr.

Select credits
Picture Snatcher (1933)
Headline Shooter (1933)
Dancing Lady (1933)
 Highway West (1941)
Joe Smith, American (1942)
Kid Glove Killer (1942)
Till the End of Time (1946)
The Farmer's Daughter (1947)
Tension (1950)
Prisoner of War (1954)

References

External links

American male screenwriters
1903 births
1990 deaths
Place of birth missing
Place of death missing
20th-century American male writers
20th-century American screenwriters